Jean-Claude Usunier is an Honorary Professor of Marketing at HEC Lausanne, Switzerland, and author of various books on marketing and culture, including International Marketing: A Cultural Approach, Marketing Across Cultures and International and Cross-Cultural Management Research.

Selected bibliography
(listed in order of first year of publication)

References

Year of birth missing (living people)
Living people